Rob Keefe (born November 5, 1980) is a former arena football defensive specialist and coach. Keefe has five championship victories and is the only person in arena football history to win ArenaCup (af2) and ArenaBowl (AFL) titles as both a player and a coach. As of the 2022 season, he is an assistant head coach and defensive coordinator with the Northern Arizona Wranglers in the Indoor Football League.

Playing career

Mercyhurst
Keefe attended Mercyhurst College (Erie, PA) from 1999 to 2003. He delivered nine interceptions in his career and ranks 27th in school history with 166 career tackles. Also a standout on special teams, Keefe holds the school's career record with 643 yards on punt returns.

Spokane Shock
Keefe joined the Spokane Shock (then af2) for the club’s inaugural season in 2006, helping the franchise secure its first ArenaCup Championship. He ended his two-year tenure with the Shock as the team’s career leader in tackles (168) and interceptions (19), twice earning all-af2 accolades as a defensive back.

Philadelphia Soul
Keefe entered the AFL in 2008 as a member of the Philadelphia Soul. In his only AFL season as a player, Keefe helped the Soul earn a victory over the San Jose SaberCats in ArenaBowl XXII.

Coaching career

Spokane Shock
In 2009, Keefe joined the Spokane Shock as the defensive backs coach. That season, the Shock boasted the af2’s top-ranked scoring defense, allowing just 37.6 points per game. Keefe’s secondary surrendered the fifth-lowest number of passing yards per game (231.6) and registered the second-highest interception total in the league (34). The season culminated in an ArenaCup Championship title.

Keefe was promoted to head coach of the Shock when the organization joined the Arena Football League in 2010. Under Keefe’s guidance, Spokane finished with the best record in the AFL (13-3 regular season) while producing the League’s fourth-ranked scoring defense (52.7 ppg). Keefe became the youngest coach in AFL history to win a championship, as the Shock defeated the Tampa Bay Storm in ArenaBowl XXIII.

Orlando Predators
Keefe began the 2012 season as the offensive coordinator of the Orlando Predators. On April 10, 2012, it was announced that Keefe had been fired and replaced as offensive coordinator by Ben Bennett.

Utah Blaze
Keefe took over as the new Defensive Coordinator of the Utah Blaze midway through the 2012 season and engineered a dramatic turnaround on that side of the ball. After allowing an average of 64 points over the first 10 games of the season, Utah allowed just over 51 points per contest under Keefe. In the opening round of the 2012 postseason, the change in culture was loudly put on display as the Blaze defense surrendered a mere 34 points in a victory over the top-seeded San Antonio Talons.

Orlando Predators
On December 24, 2013, Keefe was named the new head coach of the Orlando Predators. In his first season as head coach of the Orlando Predators, Keefe directed the franchise to its first division title since 2006, coming within one win of a berth in the Arena Bowl. The 2014 Orlando Predators secured the South Division Championship and reached the American Conference Championship after knocking off the 15-3 Pittsburgh Power in the opening round of the postseason.

Albany Empire
On November 7, 2017, Keefe was named the head coach of the AFL 2018 expansion team in Albany later named the Albany Empire. He led the team to a victory in Arena Bowl XXXII in their second season. The Arena Football League, and all its teams, folded after the season.

In 2020, a new Albany Empire was launched in the National Arena League to begin play in the 2021 season, with Keefe announced as the inaugural coach. He resigned on April 12, 2021, before ever coaching a game for the new team due to disagreements with the new owners. The next day, he was hired by the Iowa Barnstormers of the Indoor Football League to be the assistant head coach and defensive coordinator under Les Moss, who had been Keefe's assistant in Albany.

Head coaching record

References

1980 births
Living people
People from Springfield, Virginia
Players of American football from Virginia
American football defensive backs
Mercyhurst Lakers football players
Spokane Shock players
Philadelphia Soul players
Spokane Shock coaches
Utah Blaze coaches
Orlando Predators coaches
Albany Empire (AFL) coaches
Sportspeople from Fairfax County, Virginia